The Fog City Rollers (FCR) is a roller derby league based in Saint John, New Brunswick. Founded in 2010, the league consists of two teams, which compete against teams from other leagues, and is a member of the Women's Flat Track Derby Association (WFTDA).

History
The league was founded in February 2010 by two women, Darla Derringer and Suzie Skinher.  Their initial membership drive was successful, with more than forty women attending the first practice session.  These sessions initially took place at the Quispamsis Arena.

In September 2012, Fog City hosted the Roller Derby Association of Canada's first Atlantic Canada Roller Derby Championship, taking second place in tournament, and qualifying for the following year's national championship.

Fog City was accepted as a member of the Women's Flat Track Derby Association Apprentice Program in April 2013. Fog City became a full member of the WFTDA in September 2016.

WFTDA rankings

References

Sport in Saint John, New Brunswick
Roller derby leagues established in 2010
Roller derby leagues in Canada
2010 establishments in New Brunswick